Cychrus cordicollis is a species of ground beetle in the subfamily of Carabinae. It was described by Chaudoir in 1835.

References

cordicollis
Beetles described in 1835